The Russian Navy Code of Signals is a collection of flaghoist signals, which is used together with semaphore alphabet for the transmission of information between the ships of the Russian Navy and also with the shore. Its use resembles that of the signals of other navies but it is only used within the Russian fleet. For communication with foreign or civilian vessels the International Code of Signals is used.

The Russian Navy Code of Signals originates from a similar code of signals used by the Imperial Russian Navy. It was used by the Soviet Navy and with mostly insignificant changes remains in use by the Naval fleet of the Russian Federation.

The complete set of flags consists of 59 flags: 32 flags correspond to the letters of Russian alphabet, 10 flags correspond to numbers, 4 flags are substitutes and 13 have special values.

The flag used by the Soviet Navy for the third substitute was based on the jack of the Imperial Russian Navy. Now that the Russian Federation is again using the old imperial jack, a new flag design is used for the third substitute.

The 32 Letters

The 10 Digits

The four substitutes and 13 special flags

References

External links

 Russian Centre of Vexillology and Heraldry (in Russian)
 Russian Navy News Website (in Russian)

Cyrillic alphabet representations
Emergency communication
Naval flags
Russian Navy
Signal flags
Soviet Navy